Pedioplanis inornata, known commonly as the plain sand lizard or the western sand lizard, is a species of lizard in the family Lacertidae. The species is endemic to Southern Africa.

Geographic range
P. inornata is found in Namibia and South Africa.

Description
The "window" in the lower eyelid is composed of 2–4 large semitransparent scales. Dorsally, P. inornata is uniformly grayish brown, and it has pale greenish spots on the flanks.

Reproduction
P. inornata is oviparous.

References

Further reading
Conradie W, Measey GJ, Branch WR, Tolley KA (2012). "Revised phylogeny of African sand lizards (Pedioplanis), with the description of two new species from south-western Angola". African Journal of Herpetology 61 (2): 91–112.
Herrmann H-W, Branch WR (2013). "Fifty years of herpetological research in the Namib desert and Namibia with an updated and annotated species checklist". Journal of Arid Environments 93: 94–115.
Makokha JS, Mayer W, Matthee CA (2007). "Nuclear and mtDNA-based phylogeny of southern African sand lizards, Pedioplanis (Sauria: Lacertidae)". Molecular Phylogenetics and Evolution 44 (2): 622–633.
Roux J (1907). "Beiträge zur Kenntnis der Fauna von Süd-Afrika. Ergebnisse einer Reise von Prof. Max Weber im Jahre 1894. VII. Lacertilia (Eidechsen)". Zoologische Jahrbücher. Abteilung für Systematik, Geographie und Biologie der Tier, Jena 25: 403–444. (Eremias inornata, new species, pp. 427-429 + Plate 15, figures 10–12). (in German).

Pedioplanis
Lacertid lizards of Africa
Reptiles of Namibia
Reptiles of South Africa
Reptiles described in 1907
Taxa named by Jean Roux